Phil Zevenbergen (born April 13, 1964) is a retired American professional basketball player.

A 6'10" (2.08 m) power forward born in Seattle, Washington, Zevenbergen played collegiately at Seattle Pacific University, Edmonds Community College and the University of Washington. He was selected in the third round (50th overall) of the 1987 NBA Draft by the San Antonio Spurs, and played eight games for them in 1987–88, averaging 3.8 points and 1.6 rebounds per game.

He has also played professionally in Italy, Spain, France, Macedonia and Poland.

Notes

External links
College & NBA stats @ basketballreference.com

1964 births
Living people
American expatriate basketball people in France
American expatriate basketball people in Italy
American expatriate basketball people in North Macedonia
American expatriate basketball people in Poland
American expatriate basketball people in Spain
American men's basketball players
Baloncesto Málaga players
Basketball players from Seattle
Junior college men's basketball players in the United States
KK Rabotnički players
Liga ACB players
Metropolitans 92 players
Power forwards (basketball)
San Antonio Spurs draft picks
San Antonio Spurs players
Seattle Pacific Falcons men's basketball players
Unia Tarnów basketball players
Viola Reggio Calabria players
Washington Huskies men's basketball players